The Bazalgette Range is a small mountain range on the Coast of British Columbia, Canada, to the northwest of Loughborough Inlet in the Discovery Islands region.  It is named after Captain George Bazalgette, commander of the Royal Marines Light Infantry in the Colony of British Columbia.  The range is a subrange of the Pacific Ranges of the Coast Mountains.

References

External links
Bazalgette Range in the Canadian Mountain Encyclopedia.

South Coast of British Columbia
Mountain ranges of British Columbia